Islamic Cooperation Investment Bank,  also known as Taawen Islamic Bank is a private bank in Iraq that was established in 2006. The bank has 10 branches across Iraq and one branch in Tehran, Iran. It is one of the five foreign banks with an office in Iran as of 2017.

See also 

 List of banks in Iraq

References

External links 

Banks of Iraq 
Iran–Iraq relations
Banks established in 2006
Foreign banks in Iran
Iraqi companies established in 2006